Metal Supermarkets is a provider of small quantity metals, cut to the customer's desired size, with no minimum order quantities. Primarily a franchise network, Metal Supermarkets possesses the largest network in the small quantity metals industry and the only one with international reach. Metal Supermarkets’ main headquarters are located in Mississauga, Ontario, Canada with support offices in Leicester, England and Sydney, Nova Scotia, Canada. The company's locations extend across Canada, the United States and the United Kingdom. Currently, Metal Supermarkets operates over 115 locations worldwide, with more under development.

History 

Metal Supermarkets was established in 1985 as a single location in Mississauga, Ontario. Its founder, William "Bill" Mair, wanted to address the demand for small quantities of metal that large metal distributors could not satisfy, while providing efficient, friendly and reliable service. Therefore, Metal Supermarkets adopted a business model based on cut-to-size metals and no minimum order size.

Metal Supermarkets began franchising in 1987, eventually expanding into the United Kingdom in 1994 and the United States in 1996. In 2007, Metal Supermarkets acquired and then integrated Metal Express, a similar metal distributor based in the United States. Metal Supermarkets opened its 100th location in 2020 and currently operates worldwide in addition to an e-commerce website. 

In 2021, Metal Supermarkets was ranked the 381st best franchise on the annual Entrepreneur Franchise 500 list. The company continues to expand its presence across North America and the United Kingdom. serving over 250,000 loyal customers across various industries, using a unique approach to metal distribution.

Metal Supermarkets is a private company that also owns the FlannelJax's business system (www.flanneljaxs.com). The current President and CEO is Stephen Schober and the Chief Operating and Development Officer is Andrew Arminen.

Metal Products

Metal Supermarkets stocks many different kinds of metal including Alloy Steel, Aluminum, Cold Rolled Steel, Hot Rolled Steel, Stainless Steel, Brass, Copper, Tool Steel and more. Additionally, stores source hard to find metals for customers with specific requests.

Metal Supermarkets offers over 8,000 metal products, shapes and grades through physical locations and its online store. The requested metal can then be cut to size, picked up by the customer or delivered.

Services

In addition to supplying metal, Metal Supermarkets locations provide a variety of cutting and processing services. Alongside delivery services, sourcing hard-to-find products, production cutting and shearing are standard services at all Metal Supermarkets. Select Metal Supermarkets stores also offer additional cutting services such as: 
Plasma cutting
Waterjet cutting
Bending and press brake
Hole punching
Miter cutting
Laser cutting
Notching
Flame cutting

Locations

As of March 20, 2023, Metal Supermarkets has 118 locations, including 25 in Canada, 85 in the United States, 7 in the UK, and 1 in Scotland. Franchisees are provided comprehensive IT support, marketing support, as well as access to best practices through recurring training courses, webinars and newsletters.

Canada

The first Metal Supermarkets store was established in Mississauga, Ontario by company founder, William “Bill” H. Mair in 1985 and still operates today. In 1987, Metal Supermarkets began franchising and opened its second location in Scarborough, Ontario before expanding to additional provinces including Alberta and British Columbia. Metal Supermarkets currently operates 25 stores in 5 Provinces across the country, including British Columbia, Alberta, Manitoba, Ontario and Nova Scotia.

United Kingdom

Following the successful opening of several locations in Canada, Metal Supermarkets expanded into the UK in 1994 with a store in the Birmingham area. There are now 7 locations across the UK and 1 in Scotland, with the latest opening in London, Greenwich in July 2022.

United States

After finding success in the Canadian and UK markets, Metal Supermarkets entered the United States in 1996 with the opening of the Atlanta, GA location. The Metal Supermarkets Atlanta serves as the company’s longest running US franchise. The following year, Metal Supermarkets opened three more US locations: Buffalo, NY, Cincinnati, OH, and Dallas, TX and has continued US expansion ever since. In 2020, after 35 years of operation, Metal Supermarkets opened its milestone 100th store in San Diego, CA. Metal Supermarkets currently operates 85 stores in 34 states across the country.

Awards

In 2021, Metal Supermarkets was ranked the 381st best franchise on the annual Entrepreneur Franchise 500 list.

Other honors include:

 In 2018, Metal Supermarkets' President & CEO, Stephen Schober, is elected a Director of the Canadian Franchise Association
 Included in the Franchise Dictionary Magazine's Top 100 Game Changes for 2021

Community Involvement

Metal Supermarkets has been a long-time supporter of the skilled trades and trade schools. In 2019, the company conducted a survey on students' perception of trade careers. This revealed the negative perceptions of trade schools and the lack of awareness for careers in trades. 

Metal Supermarkets franchises have also actively given high school students the opportunity to gain hands-on industry experience, while better educating young people on the stable and successful career opportunities offered by the trades. 

Several Metal Supermarkets franchisees have even spoken on media platforms, advocating for the trades as viable and in-demand career options. Some Metal Supermarkets franchisees even make regular metal donations to local schools in their area.

Trade School Scholarship

In April 2022, Metal Supermarkets launched the Trade School Scholarship in honor of National Welding Month. The annual initiative aims to combat the nationwide shortage of skilled trade workers by supporting those starting on the path of a trade career by attending a post-secondary trade school. The scholarship is awarded to students who demonstrated academic achievement as well as commitment to and skill in their chosen technical field.

Each year, four deserving recipients receive a $2,500 scholarship to support their continued education.

Metal My Way

Metal Supermarkets runs a yearly photo submission contest where entrants can submit a photo or video of their metal projects via metalmyway.com for a chance to win great prizes. Recent winners include Richard Weber, Jennifer Phillips, Eric Moebius, Rick Redfield, John Simons and Kevin Stone.

References 

Companies based in Ontario
Privately held companies of Canada
Franchises
Retail companies of Canada
Metal companies of Canada
Retail companies established in 1985
1985 establishments in Ontario